127th Brigade may refer to:

 127th Mixed Brigade (Spain)
 127th (Manchester) Brigade (United Kingdom)

See also

 127th Division (disambiguation)